Munseong of Silla (died 857) (reigned 839–857) was the 46th ruler of the Korean kingdom of Silla.  He was the eldest son of King Sinmu and Lady Jeonggye.

Munseong's reign was typical of late Unified Silla, with rampant strife and uprisings.  Examples include the 841 rebellion of Hong Pil, the 846 rebellion of Jang Bogo (after he failed to marry his daughter into the royal line), as well as the treason of Kim Sik in 849.

The earlier part of his reign was marked by relatively  active trade and commerce with both Japan and Tang China.  This was due to Jang Bogo's role in securing the major shipping routes.

Upon his death in 857, King Munseong was buried in the Gongjakji tomb precinct in Gyeongju.  He was succeeded by his uncle Heonan.

Family 
Parents
Father: Sinmu of Silla (r. 839, died 839)
Grandfather: Prince Hyechung (혜충태자)
Grandmother: Queen Mother Seongmok of the Gyeongju Kim clan (성목태후 김씨)
Mother: Lady Jeonggye (정계부인)
Consorts and their respective issue:
Queen Somyeong of the Kim clan (소명왕후); daughter of Prince Kim Gyun-jung (김균정),
Adopted Son: King Heonan –He was the younger half-brother of King Sinmu. 
Lady Heunmyeong (흔명부인)
Son: Kim Ahn (김안)

See also
List of Korean monarchs
List of Silla people
Unified Silla

References

Silla rulers
857 deaths
9th-century Korean monarchs
Year of birth unknown